Brevundimonas vancanneytii is a Gram-negative, rod-shaped and non-spore-forming bacterium from the genus of Brevundimonas which has been isolated from human blood. The bacterium has been named after doctor Marc Vancanneyt who was working at the University of Ghent.

References

External links
Type strain of Brevundimonas vancanneytii at BacDive -  the Bacterial Diversity Metadatabase

Bacteria described in 2010
Caulobacterales